Jessica Lingmin Yu (born February 14, 1966) is an American film director, writer, producer, and editor. She has directed documentary films, dramatic films, and television shows.

Yu won the Academy Award for Best Documentary Short Subject in 1996 for Breathing Lessons: The Life and Work of Mark O'Brien (1996). Yu's film Last Call at the Oasis (2012) is based upon Alex Prud'homme's Ripple Effect. Her more recent films have been: Misconception (2014), ForEveryone.Net (2016), a documentary film about the inventor of the World Wide Web, Sir Tim Berners-Lee, and a Netflix comedy Maria Bamford: Old Baby (2017).  In 2019, Yu was nominated for an Emmy Award for "Outstanding Direction for a Limited Series, Movie, or Dramatic Special" for the Fosse/Verdon episode "Glory".

Early life and education
Yu grew up in Los Altos Hills, California. Her father, Dr. Kou-ping Yu, an oncologist, was born in Shanghai. Her mother, Connie Young Yu, writer and historian, is a third-generation Californian.

Yu graduated from Gunn High School in Palo Alto. She was a reporter for the school newspaper, The Oracle.

She went on to attend Yale University, where she was a two-time NCAA All-American and three-time All-Ivy in fencing. As a world-class foilist, she was a member of the Junior World Team and the United States national team at the World Championships and World University Games. Yu graduated from Yale University in 1987 summa cum laude, Phi Beta Kappa, with a bachelor's degree in English.

Career 
After graduation, Yu thought of pursuing law school like her peers. However, her father discouraged her from doing so. She discovered film production while searching for a job that allowed flexible hours to allow her to compete in fencing. She started as a production assistant in 1989 on a few commercials, where she got to arrange frozen noodles on forks and re-park cars. When she started working in documentary, she became further intrigued by the process. Yu refused to attend film school and gained her film education on the job. She focuses on making documentaries but says that one day she'd love to make a fully animated comedy feature. The opportunity to make film is a random occurrence for Yu. Her documentary films present worldwide issues that people face every day and allow the subjects to speak for themselves as much as possible. She is adamant that story should come before politics. Her films intend to inform the general public to incite people to become active in everyday issues such as water conservation and regulation. When not making documentaries and feature films, Yu spends time directing television shows.

1990s 
Yu began her career in 1993 with her short Sour Death Balls, a silent black-and-white montage of assorted subjects’ reactions to blindingly bitter candy, which was shot on an old school Bell & Howell wind-up camera. She got her inspirations from daily interactions in her life, i.e. when a child offered local people sour candy. Yu sent the short film to film festivals, and it became her first feature at the Telluride Film Festival in 1993. Yu made her first documentary, Men of Reenaction (1994), which explores the extremes of people searching for authenticity through Civil War reenacting.

Her most famous work was her Academy Award-winning Breathing Lessons: The Life and Work of Mark O’Brien. The documentary short features Berkeley writer Mark O'Brien, a disabled poet with an iron lung. His editor at the Pacific News Service, Sandy Close, introduced the pair and suggested that a film be made. It debuted at the 1996 Sundance Film Festival and won several honors, including the International Documentary Association Achievement Award for Best Documentary, before the Academy Awards.

2000s 
In the 2000s, Yu's chance to work in episodic TV came when she received an invitation to apprentice at John Wells Productions as the first participant of their director diversity program. Shadowing directors, Yu sensed she was a guinea pig. “If you screw this up,” she told herself, “they’ll never let another woman of color from documentaries do this again.” While working for Wells’ production company, she began directing in television for shows like Grey's Anatomy and The West Wing. On her first directorial assignment, an episode of The West Wing, Yu was heartened that Wells encouraged her stylistic input. “He made a point of saying, ‘You should bring your own ideas to the table,’ rather than just follow prescribed formula.” So she decided to open with a series of mood-establishing low, wide-angle shots to signal the calm before the gathering storm.

She directed a sport comedy film, Ping Pong Playa (2007), that explored Asian family culture through a Chinese ping pong playing son that is trying to prove himself to his family. Her producer friends Joan Huang and Jeff Guo approached her with the idea of working on a comedy together. They felt the time was right to have an obnoxious Asian American character on the screen. Yu and her comrades felt that Asian American cinema had plenty of good dramas and wanted to fill the void of superficial comedy. She tried to bring the same loose hand and adaptability she used for documentaries to scripted material. Her approach to Ping Pong Playa was to “have a lighter touch, especially with actors” to give them a sense of freedom.

2010s 
In her later documentaries such as Last Call at The Oasis (2011) and Misconception (2014) , Yu focused on capturing the big picture and understanding how these issues intertwined with other aspects of life such as climate, population, and the environment. Last Call at The Oasis addresses the water crisis in the United States, and working on the film made her consider the impact of the crisis on her children and their children. This project became more personal to Yu and compelled her to complete it. It took six months of research prior to filming, as Yu wanted to create the big picture of the facts and threats of the water crisis in the domestic United States.

Last Call at the Oasis inspired Yu to direct her 2014 documentary Misconception, which paints the population issues from a person-to-person point of view. While filming Last Call at the Oasis people questioned the purpose of acting on water conservation because they cannot control the population growth affecting it. Her main goal is to take this topic and tie with emotionally, entertaining, and interesting stories.

The majority of her work after 2015 has been focused on television production and directing. For Netflix, she directed episodes of the dramas 13 Reasons Why and Hollywood  and did Maria Bamford's comedy special Old Baby.

2020s 
Jessica's work in the 2020s includes directing a number of television drama series. This Is Us (Don't Let Me Keep You, 2021), The Morning Show (Kill the Fatted Calf, 2021), In Treatment (Brooke, Laila, Colins, Eladio, 2021).

Personal life

Yu is married to author Mark Salzman. They and their daughters, Ava and Esme, live in Los Angeles.

Jessica has an older sister, Jennifer Yu, a technical publications manager, and a younger brother, Martin Yu, an actor.

Filmography

Short films

Film

TV Series

Awards and nominations

Further reading 
 Fry, Nathan, "2002 Alumni Spotlight: Jessica Yu",  Ivy League Sports, Council of Ivy Group presidents
"Pizarro: Documentary filmmaker shows us her comedic side". The Mercury News. 2008-09-02. Retrieved 2018-11-13.
Klady, Leonard (1997-05-22). "Breathing Lessons: The Life and Work of Mark O'Brien". Variety. Retrieved 2018-11-13.
"Metroactive Movies | Jessica Yu". www.metroactive.com. Retrieved 2018-11-13.
https://www.imdb.com/name/nm0950506/

References

External links

Foreveryone.net
We the Economy 
Social Action and Filmmaking with Jessica You
Ping Pong Playa official film website 
Protagonist official film website
In The Realms Of The Unreal official film website by Diorama Films, LLC

1966 births
Living people
21st-century American screenwriters
21st-century American women writers
American documentary filmmakers
American film directors of Chinese descent
American film producers
American people of Chinese descent
American television directors
American television writers
Directors of Best Documentary Short Subject Academy Award winners
American women television directors
Writers from Palo Alto, California
American women screenwriters
Yale University alumni
Film directors from California
People from Los Altos Hills, California
Screenwriters from California
American women documentary filmmakers
American women television writers
Gunn High School alumni